TableCurve 2D is a linear and non-linear Curve fitting software package for engineers and scientists that automates the curve fitting process and in a single processing step instantly fits and ranks 3,600+ built-in frequently encountered equations enabling users to easily find the ideal model to their 2D data within seconds.

Once the user has selected the best fit equation, they can output high-quality function and test programming codes or generate comprehensive reports and publication quality graphs.

TableCurve 2D was originally developed by Ron Brown of AISN Software. The first version of TableCurve 2D was released in 1989.  The first version was a DOS product. The first Windows based product was introduced in the last quarter of 1992.

It was distributed by Jandel Scientific Software in the late 1980s but by January 2004, Systat Software acquired the exclusive worldwide rights from SPSS, Inc. to distribute SigmaPlot and other Sigma Series products. Systat Software is now based in San Jose, California.

TableCurve 2D saves time by taking the endless trial and error out of curve fitting and that can help solve complex science and engineering problems faster.

Related links 
SYSTAT
PeakFit
TableCurve 3D

External links 
 Systat Webpage
 TableCurve 2D Support Webpage

Plotting software
Regression and curve fitting software